Dunham Hill may refer to:

 Dunham Hill (Huntington, Texas), listed on the NRHP in Texas, in the U.S.
 Dunham on the Hill, Cheshire, in England